Terry Addison (born 11 January 1946) is an Australian former international tennis player. He competed in the Australian Open three times, from 1967 to 1969. He was born in Wondai, Queensland.

Grand Slam finals

Doubles:  (1 runner-up)

References

External links 
 
 

1946 births
Living people
Australian male tennis players
20th-century Australian people